The athletics competitions at the 2019 Southeast Asian Games in the Philippines took place at the New Clark City Athletics Stadium in New Clark City.

The 2019 Games featured competitions in 23 events ( track,  road,  field and  combined).

Men

100 metres

Records
Prior to this competition, the existing Asian and SEA Games records were as follows:

Results
Green denotes finalists.
Wind: Heat 1 -0.1 m/s, Heat 2 +0.0 m/s, Final 0.1 m/s

200 metres

Records
Prior to this competition, the existing Asian and SEA Games records were as follows:

Results
Green denotes finalists.

400 metres

Records
Prior to this competition, the existing Asian and SEA Games records were as follows:

Results
Green denotes finalists.

800 metres

Records
Prior to this competition, the existing Asian and SEA Games records were as follows:

Results

1500 metres

Records
Prior to this competition, the existing Asian and SEA Games records were as follows:

Results

5000 metres

Records
Prior to this competition, the existing Asian and SEA Games records were as follows:

Results

10000 metres

Records
Prior to this competition, the existing Asian and SEA Games records were as follows:

Results

110 metres hurdles

Records
Prior to this competition, the existing Asian and SEA Games records were as follows:

Results

400 metres hurdles

Records
Prior to this competition, the existing Asian and SEA Games records were as follows:

Results

References

Results